Chris Wyse (born 15 July 1969) is an American bassist and vocalist. He is best known for his performances with Hollywood Vampires, Ace Frehley, The Cult and Ozzy Osbourne. He is the vocalist and bassist for Owl, a band he founded in 2007.

Early life
Wyse is a first-generation Irish American. He was born in Queens, New York. He discovered the music of Kiss, The Doors, and Led Zeppelin in grade school, and was inspired by Iron Maiden's Steve Harris to play bass. Performing with local bands in New York, he was profiled in Guitar Player Magazine at 17 and featured in Guitar For the Practicing Musician at 20.

Career

Bob Rock, The Cult
In 1990, prompted by the success of a studio session with musicians associated with Steve Vai, Wyse moved to Los Angeles, where he devoted most of his time to playing with bands. After performing with artists including the band Lusk (with Guns N' Roses's Chris Pitman and Tool's Paul D'Amour), Wyse was introduced to acclaimed producer Bob Rock and became Rock's "go-to" bassist. He played with Rock-produced artists including Tal Bachman, as well as artists unaffiliated with Rock, such as Scott Weiland. In 2001, Wyse played on The Cult's well-reviewed album, Beyond Good and Evil, which Rock produced. In 2003, Rock, who was then producing Metallica, urged Wyse to audition for the band. He was one of a handful of bassists selected to play with Metallica during the audition process, which was documented in the film Some Kind of Monster.

In 2006, he became The Cult's full-time bass player, touring worldwide and recording two additional albums.

Ozzy Osbourne, Owl
In 2004, Wyse was recruited for Ozzy Osbourne's band by drummer Mike Bordin after they met while playing as part of Jerry Cantrell's solo band. He played on Ozzy's Under Cover album, which was included on Osbourne's box set, Prince of Darkness. Wyse also played on Jerry Cantrell's covers band Cardboard Vampyres. Additionally, Wyse performed and recorded with Bob Rock's band, the Payola$.

In 2007, Wyse founded Owl, an alternative rock band. He is the band's singer, songwriter, and producer, and plays bass guitar and upright bass, sometimes creating "Hendrik-like effect on the upright bass" by using a bow. Wyse formed Owl with his childhood friend, drummer Dan Dinsmore, and LA-based guitarist Jason Achilles Mezilis. Described as "approaching timeless rock structures through a healthy amount of experimentation and instrumental intricacy" Owl released their debut in 2009, followed by the album The Right Thing in April 2013. The first music video from the album, the title track's The Right Thing, premiered on Rolling Stone's website in March 2013. Owl released their third album, Things You Can't See, in the summer of 2015. Owl's third album, Things You Can't See, was released in summer 2015. A video for the track

Ace Frehley, Hollywood Vampires
Wyse played bass guitar on Ace Frehley's album, Space Invader He toured with Frehley following the release of Space Invader.  Things You Can't See was released in 2015, as was Frehley's Origins Vol 1. Wyse played bass on the record, which featured Paul Stanley on vocals for the track Fire and Water.

Wyse left The Cult in 2015, and has continued to tour and record with Frehley. In January 2018 he played "New York Groove" with Frehley prior to the Bridgestone NHL Winter Classic between the New York Rangers and Buffalo Sabres at Citi Field.  The song is a staple at New York sporting events; it is played when the New York Giants score and when the New York Mets win.

Wyse joined the Hollywood Vampires in 2018. A supergroup that includes Joe Perry, Alice Cooper, and Johnny Depp, Wyse performed with the Vampires on world tours in 2018 and 2019, and played on their sophomore album, Rise,  released on Ear Music in 2019.

Discography

Videography/Filmography/Television Appearances

References

External links 
  Official website

Living people
The Ozzy Osbourne Band members
The Cult members
American rock bass guitarists
American male bass guitarists
1969 births
American male guitarists
20th-century American guitarists
Hollywood Vampires (band) members